Kanykayevo (Qanıqay) is a rural locality (a selo) in Bikkulovsky Selsoviet, Bizhbulyaksky District, Bashkortostan, Russia. The population was 360 as of 2010. There are 7 streets.

Geography 
Kanykayevo is located 37 km southwest of Bizhbulyak (the district's administrative centre) by road. Bikkulovo is the nearest rural locality.

References 

Rural localities in Bizhbulyaksky District